Ankyrin repeat and FYVE domain-containing protein 1 is a protein that in humans is encoded by the ANKFY1 gene.

Function 

This gene encodes a cytoplasmic protein that contains a coiled-coil structure and a BTB/POZ domain at its N-terminus, ankyrin repeats in the middle portion, and a FYVE-finger motif at its C-terminus. This protein belongs to a subgroup of double zinc finger proteins which may be involved in vesicle or protein transport. Alternative splicing has been observed at this locus and two variants, each encoding a distinct isoform, have been identified.

References

External links

Further reading